is a passenger railway station located in the city of Tokushima, Tokushima Prefecture, Japan. It is operated by JR Shikoku and has the station number "B04".

Lines
Only local trains stop at the station.

Layout
The station, which is unstaffed, consists of two opposed side platforms serving two tracks. Track 1 is the through-track while track 2 is a passing loop. The station building has been unstaffed since 2010  and serves only as a waiting room. Access to the opposite platform is by means of a footbridge.

Platforms

Adjacent stations

History
When the company was nationalized on 1 September 1907, Japanese Government Railways (JGR) took over control of the station and operated it as part of the Tokushima Line (later the Tokushima Main Line). With the privatization of Japanese National Railways (JNR), the successor of JGR, on 1 April 1987, the station came under the control of JR Shikoku. On 1 June 1988, the line was renamed the Tokushima Line.

Passenger statistics
In fiscal 2019, the station was used by an average of 584 passengers daily

Surrounding area
Although it is the central station of Kokufu-cho, the road in front of the station is narrow and the villages are cluttered. It is like a station in a residential area.
Tokushima City Kokufu Junior High School
 Shikoku Pilgrimage 14th Fudasho Jōraku-ji

See also
List of railway stations in Japan

References

External links

 JR Shikoku timetable

Railway stations in Tokushima Prefecture
Railway stations in Japan opened in 1899
Tokushima (city)